The Bronaugh Apartments, also known as the Hyland Apartments, Olive Apartments, and Ellsworth Apartments (originally named as three component sub-buildings), are a historic building in Portland, Oregon, United States. Constructed for Araminta Payne Bronaugh in 1905 during Portland's period of rapid growth around the Lewis and Clark Centennial Exposition, it was one of the city's earliest modern apartment buildings, contrasting with the boarding houses that were already common. The property is closely associated with three generations of the Bronaugh family, who were prominent in Oregon law and politics, and who owned the building for nearly 50 years.

The building was added to the National Register of Historic Places in 1980.

See also
National Register of Historic Places listings in Southwest Portland, Oregon

References

External links

1905 establishments in Oregon
Residential buildings completed in 1905
Apartment buildings on the National Register of Historic Places in Portland, Oregon
Italianate architecture in Oregon
Southwest Portland, Oregon
Portland Historic Landmarks